The XIV International Brigade was one of several international brigades that fought for the Spanish Second Republic during the Spanish Civil War.

History and structure
It was raised on 20 December 1936 with volunteers mainly from France and Belgium, under General "Walter" (Karol Świerczewski). This Brigade was the fourth of the international brigades, and it mixed veterans with new, idealistic volunteers. It was formally named the Marseillaise Brigade, after the French revolutionary song (and national anthem).

Units
With subsequent consolidations and reorganisations, the XIV International Brigade included, among others, the following battalions: all or elements of the following units:
Commune de Paris Battalion
Domingo Germinal Battalion
Henri Barbusse Battalion
Louise Michel (I) Battalion
Louise Michel (II) Battalion
Marsellaise Battalion
Pierre Brachet Battalion
Primera Unidad de Avance Battalion
Nine Nations Battalion ("Sans nom" or "Neuf Nationalités")
Sixth of February Battalion (Franco-Belgian)
Vaillant-Couturier Battalion

Engagements
The brigade fought in the battles of Lopera, the Corunna Road, Jarama, and the Segovia Offensive.

After the Nationalist strategic victory in the Battle of Brunete (6–25 July 1937), heavy losses reduced the brigade strength from four to two battalions. However, the brigade lived on and was able to take part in the last Republican offensive of the war. As with all of the volunteer international brigades, the members of the XIV International Brigade faced a dark future after the eventual Nationalist victory.

See also
International Brigades

References

Military units and formations established in 1936
International Brigades
Mixed Brigades (Spain)
Military units and formations disestablished in 1939